Eshaqlu (also Romanized as Eshaqlū and Esheqlū; also known as Ashghaloo, Īshaqlū, and Ishikhli) is a village in Ozomdel-e Jonubi Rural District, in the Central District of Varzaqan County, East Azerbaijan Province, Iran. At the 2006 census, its population was 41, in 5 families.

References 

Towns and villages in Varzaqan County